The Narodowy Bank Polski (the National Bank of Poland), often abbreviated to NBP, is the central bank of Poland, founded in 1945. It controls the issuing of Poland's currency, the Polish złoty. The bank is headquartered in Warsaw, and has branches in 16 major Polish cities. The NBP represents Poland in the European System of Central Banks, an EU organization.

History
Although the bank has existed under its current name since 1945, it is a continuation of two previous central banks, both named simply Bank of Poland (Bank Polski). The first one was founded in Warsaw in 1828 by Prince Franciszek Ksawery Drucki-Lubecki. An institution of the government of the Kingdom of Poland, it was entitled with issuance of the Polish currency as well as control over the credit rates. It was also entitled with a concession to operate foreign currencies and buy off credits issued by foreign companies and banks.

During the Second World War the gold reserves of Poland were transferred to Romania, Great Britain and Canada. In November 1946, following the cancellation of Poland's wartime debt, the larger part of prewar gold reserves were returned to new communist authorities. In 1947, the gold deposited in Romania in 1939 was returned, while the former Bank of Poland itself was closed down and finally in 1952 absorbed by the newly created Narodowy Bank Polski.

The latter was one of two banks allowed to operate in Poland's postwar planned economy. It had a monopoly for currency, credits and accumulation of savings. The other bank, PKO Bank Polski, was responsible for private accounts. After the fall of the communist system in 1989, the market economy was reintroduced and the NBP limited its functions to currency control and supervision of other, privately controlled banks.

Structure
The structure and functioning of the Narodowy Bank Polski are regulated by article 227 of the Constitution of Poland of 1997 and the Narodowy Bank Polski Act of the same year. The President of the NBP is appointed by the Sejm, at the request of the President of the Republic of Poland, for a term of six years. The NBP President is responsible for the organisation and functioning of the Polish's central bank. The same person cannot serve as President of the NBP for more than two terms of office. Apart from his function as the superior of the NBP staff, he is also the chairman of the Monetary Policy Council, the NBP Management Board and the Commission for Banking Supervision. He is also responsible for representing Poland in international banking and financial institutions.

In 2019, the average employment at the National Bank of Poland on full-time amounts was 3312 people.

List of presidents of the NBP

 Edward Drożniak (1945–1949)
 Witold Trąmpczyński (1950–1956)
 Edward Drożniak (1956–1961)
 Adam Żebrowski (1961–1965)
 Stanisław Majewski (1965–1968)
 Leonard Siemiątkowski (1968–1972)
 Witold Bień (1973–1980)
 Stanisław Majewski (1981–1985)
 (acting) Zdzisław Pakuła (1985)
 Władysław Baka (1985–1988)
 Zdzisław Pakuła (1988–1989)
 Władysław Baka (1989–1991)
 Grzegorz Wójtowicz (1991)
 (acting) Andrzej Topiński (1991–1992)
 Hanna Gronkiewicz-Waltz (1992–2001)
 Leszek Balcerowicz (2001–2007)
 Sławomir Skrzypek (2007–2010)
 (acting) Piotr Wiesiołek (2010)
 Marek Belka (2010–2016)
 Adam Glapiński (since 2016)

Awards 

 2011 — award granted during the Numismatic Fair in Berlin "World Money Fair" for the Silver NBP coin with a denomination of PLN 10, dedicated to the Polish Underground State.
2012 —1st place at the International Coin of the Year (Coty) competition and the title of the most interesting coin of 2011 for NBP coins "Europe without barriers".
2016 — the title of the most interesting coin of the world in the prestigious numismatic contest Coin of the Year 2016 for the coins issued by the NBP, commemorating the 100th birthday of Jan Karski.
2017 — award on the Currency Conference for a collector's banknote "1050th anniversary of the Christianization of Poland" issued by the NBP.
2020 — main award by Dziennik Gazeta Prawna for supporting entrepreneurs during pandemic.

Buildings

See also

 Economy of Poland
 Monetary Policy Council
 Polish złoty

References

External links
 Narodowy Bank Polski official site

 
1945 establishments in Poland
Banks established in 1945
Poland
Poland